The 1972 CCHA Men's Ice Hockey Tournament was the first CCHA Men's Ice Hockey Tournament. It was played between March 3 and March 4, 1972, at St. Louis Arena in St. Louis, Missouri. Ohio State won the inaugural tournament, defeating Saint Louis 3–0 in the championship game.

Conference standings
Note: GP = Games played; W = Wins; L = Losses; T = Ties; PTS = Points; GF = Goals For; GA = Goals Against

Bracket

Semifinals

(1) Ohio State vs. (4) Ohio

(2) Saint Louis vs. (3) Bowling Green

Third place

(3) Bowling Green vs. (4) Ohio

Championship

(1) Ohio State vs. (2) Saint Louis

Tournament awards

All-Tournament Team
F Jerry Welsh (Ohio State)
F John Nestic (Saint Louis)
F Mike Bartley (Bowling Green)
D Jim Witherspoon (Ohio State)
D Roger Archer (Bowling Green)
G Bill McKenzie* (Ohio State)
* Most Valuable Player(s)

References

External links
Central Collegiate Hockey Association

CCHA Men's Ice Hockey Tournament
Ccha tournament